Flight 157 may refer to:

American Airlines Flight 157, crashed on 29 November 1949
Aerosucre Flight 157, crashed on 20 December 2016

0157